Andrei Yuryevich Dmitriev (born September 12, 1979, Leningrad (Saint Petersburg)) is a Russian political dissident, publicist, member of National Bolshevik Party since 1996, co-founder of coalition The Other Russia and one of leaders of the eponymous political party The Other Russia. He works as a journalist.

Biography
Dmitriev was born in Saint Petersburg. He studied in Herzen State Pedagogical University of Russia.

Political career

Since 1996 Dmitriev has been a member of the National Bolshevik Party. In 2001 he became a member of its Central Committee. In 2008 Dmitriev was one of the organizers of the Dissenters' March. In 2009 Dmitriev was one of the organizers of Strategy-31 in Saint Petersburg. Dmitriev was repeatedly detained during Strategy-31 actions. In 2010 Dmitriev co-founded the political party The Other Russia and became leader of its Saint Petersburg branch.

Filmography
Andrei Dmitriev is one of the main character in the documentary The Revolution That Wasn't and one of the main character in the French documentary Les Enfants terribles de Vladimir Vladimirovitch Poutine.

Bibliography
Under the pseudonym Andrei Balkankiy he wrote two books-biographies:
 Kim Ir Sen (Molodaya Gvardiya, 2011)
 Eduard Limonov (Molodaya Gvardiya, 2017)

References

External links
 The Other Russia - Andrei Dmitriev's biography
 Who Are the National-Bolsheviks? Article by Andrei Dmitriev
 Interview with Andrei Dmitriev on YouTube
 Speech by Andrei Dmitriev at the Congress of The Other Russia
 Speech by Andrei Dmitriev about Mao Zedong

Living people
1979 births
National Bolshevik Party politicians
Journalists from Saint Petersburg
Russian dissidents
Russian nationalists
National Bolsheviks
Politicians from Saint Petersburg